Santa Rosa Hills  may refer to:
 Santa Rosa Hills (Inyo County) in California, USA
 Santa Rosa Hills (Riverside County) in California, USA
 Santa Rosa Hills (Santa Barbara County) in California, USA

Other similar names include:
 Santa Rosa Mountains (disambiguation)
 Santa Rosa Range in Nevada, USA